East Derbyshire was a parliamentary constituency in Derbyshire which elected two Members of Parliament to the House of Commons of the Parliament of Great Britain and subsequently to the Parliament of the United Kingdom.

It was created for the 1868 general election, and abolished only seventeen years later under the Redistribution of Seats Act 1885. It was then replaced by seven new constituencies: Chesterfield,
Mid Derbyshire, North East Derbyshire, South Derbyshire, West Derbyshire, High Peak and Ilkeston.

Boundaries
1868–1885: The Hundred of Scarsdale.

Members of Parliament

Elections

Elections in the 1860s

Elections in the 1870s

Elections in the 1880s

References

Source

Parliamentary constituencies in Derbyshire (historic)
Constituencies of the Parliament of the United Kingdom established in 1868
Constituencies of the Parliament of the United Kingdom disestablished in 1885